Alexander Nicholson may refer to:

 Alexander Malcolm Nicholson (1900–1991), Canadian clergyman, farmer and politician
 Alexander John Nicholson (1895–1969), Irish-Australian entomologist
 Alexander M. Nicholson, American scientist
 Alexander Nicholson (police officer) (1863–1928), Australian police officer

See also
 Alex Nicholson (disambiguation)